Archithosia costimacula is a moth of the  subfamily Arctiinae. It was described by Paul Mabille in 1878. It is found in Cameroon, the Republic of the Congo, Equatorial Guinea, Gabon, Ghana, Malawi, Nigeria and Uganda.

References

Moths described in 1878
Lithosiini
Moths of Africa